SOR BN 9,5 is a model of partly low-floor minibus manufactured by Czech company SOR Libchavy. Bus is designed for urban transport and deployed on lines where sufficient vehicles with a smaller capacity, where due to the cramped conditions on the communication vehicles are small and suitable for service lines to medical and sanitary facilities and offices.

Construction features

Production and operation 
Bus is produced since 2005 until now.

See also 

Buses of the Czech Republic
Buses manufactured by SOR